Village Tale is a 1935 American drama film directed by John Cromwell and starring Randolph Scott, Kay Johnson, Arthur Hohl, and Robert Barrat. The screenplay by Allan Scott was adapted from author and scenarist Phil Stong in his 1934 novel of the same name. Produced by RKO Radio Pictures, it was released on May 10, 1935.

Plot

“...about a small town and its dramas...described as a series of character studies rather than a plot.”

Film historians Raymond Durgnat and Scott Simmon offer this brief synopsis of Cromwell's adaption of novelist Phil Stong’s tale of rural life, starring Randolph Scott as Slaughter Somerville:

Cast
 Randolph Scott as T. N. 'Slaughter' Somerville
 Kay Johnson as Janet Stevenson
 Arthur Hohl  Elmer Stevenson
 Robert Barrat as Drury Stevenson
 Janet Beecher as Amy Somerville
 Edward Ellis as Old Ike
 Dorothy Burgess as Lulu Stevenson
 Donald Meek as Charlie
 Andy Clyde as Storekeeper
 Guinn 'Big Boy' Williams as Ben Roberts
 Ray Mayer as Gabby
 T. Roy Barnes as Gozzy Smith
 DeWitt Jennings as Sheriff Ramsey

Footnotes

References
Canham, Kingsley. 1976. The Hollywood Professionals, Volume 5: King Vidor, John Cromwell, Mervyn LeRoy. The Tantivy Press, London. 
Durgnat, Raymond and Simmon, Scott. 1988. King Vidor, American. University of California Press, Berkeley. 

1935 films
1935 drama films
American drama films
American black-and-white films
1930s American films